Nellore district, officially known as Sri Potti Sriramulu Nellore district or simply SPSR Nellore district in Coastal Andhra Region, is one of the 26 districts in the Indian state of Andhra Pradesh. According to the 2011 Census, the district's population was 2,469,712 of which 29.07% was urban. Its administrative headquarters are located in Nellore city. Located in the Coastal Andhra region, the district is bordered by the Bay of Bengal to the east, Kadapa district and Annamayya district to the west, Prakasam district to the north, and Tirupati district to the south.

Etymology 
The name of the district is derived from the name of the district headquarters, Nellore. The district's name was Vikrama Simhapuri until the 13th century, when it became known as Nellore. The name Nellore originates from a mythological story from the Sthala Puranas which depict a lingam in the form of a stone under an amla, or nelli, tree in Nellore. The place gradually became Nelli-ooru (nelli referring to the amla tree and ooru referring to a place in the Tamil language) and then present-day Nellore.

The official name of Nellore was changed to Sri Potti Sriramulu Nellore District (SPSR Nellore) on 4 June 2008, in honour of the Indian revolutionary Potti Sri Ramulu, who died fasting in an attempt to achieve the formation of a separate state for the Telugu people, which would later become Andhra Pradesh.

History

The Nawabs and the British period 
After the fall of the Vijayanagara Empire, the area was ruled by the Nawabs. During the eighteenth century, Nellore saw wars between Najeebullah, the ruler of the area, and his brother Arcot Nawab, who received support from the British and French. Nawab's army, under the command of colonel Caillaud, took over the Nellore fort in 1762. For the purposes of revenue collection, the town of Nellore and the surrounding district were handed over to the British East India Company in 1781 and 1801, respectively. Nellore was named the revenue unit for the district.

Post Indian Independence 
In 1970, the northern parts of Nellore district were transferred to the newly-created Prakasam district.

Epigraphical records 
In Nellore district, there exist a variety of Telugu inscriptions originating from several different kingdoms. Tamil inscriptions also exist near the Mallam Subramanyeshwara Swamy temple, which was constructed by Rajendhra Chola during the fourteenth century.

Geography 
25.96% of Nellore's land area is cultivated, while 17.75% is cultivable but fallow. The remainder consists of land used for non-agricultural purposes (18.68%), forested land (20.09%) and barren land (10.56%) unsuitable for human cultivation.

Climate 
Nellore is subjected to both droughts and floods, depending on the seasons.

Beaches
Mypadu Beach is a Bay of Bengal beach in Nellore district.

Koduru Beach is a Bay of Bengal beach in Nellore district.

Demographics 
According to the 2011 census, Nellore district had a population of 2,963,557, which ranked it at 126 out of 640 districts of India. Out of this, the rural population is 21.06 lakhs and urban population is 8.58 lakhs forming 71.06% and 28.94% respectively of total population. Its population grew by 11.15% between 2001 to 2011. Nellore district had a sex ratio of 986 females for every 1000 males, and a literacy rate of 69.15%.

After bifurcation Nellore district had a population of 24,69,712, of which 705,893 (28.58%) lived in urban areas. Nellore district has a sex ratio of 983 females per 1000 males. Scheduled Castes and Scheduled Tribes make up 5,04,941 (20.45%) and 2,15,452 (8.72%) of the population respectively.

At the time of the 2011 census, 88.34% of the population spoke Telugu and 9.56% Urdu as their first language. Nearly 20,000 people spoke a language registered as 'Others' on the census.

Economy 
The Gross District Domestic Product (GDDP) of Nellore district is  crore (304.82 billion rupees) and makes up 5.8% of Andhra Pradesh's Gross State Domestic Product (GSDP). The primary, secondary and tertiary sectors of the district contribute  crore,  crore and  crore (97.29 billion, 63.2 billion and 144.33 billion rupees), respectively. The major agricultural contributors to the district's gross value added (GVA) include: paddy, sugarcane, lemon, tomato, milk, meat and fisheries. The major industrial and service contributors to the district's GVA include: construction, electricity, manufacturing, transport and education.

Mining 
Nellore district produces most of the crude mica in India. Between 2011 and 2012, Nellore produced 1,784 tonnes of crude mica, the majority of India's total production of 1,899 tonnes.

Administrative divisions 

The district has four revenue divisions which include Kandukuru, Kavali, Atmakur and Nellore each of which is headed by a sub-collector. These revenue divisions are divided into 38 mandals, which consist of 1,177 villages and 12 towns (urban settlements). A total of 940 gram panchayats are in position comprising all notified Gram Panchayats. Nellore's twelve urban settlements include six statutory towns and six census towns. The statutory towns consist of one municipal corporation (Nellore) and Three municipalities (Atmakur ,Kavali and Kandukur).

Mandals 
The following table lists the 38 mandals in Nellore district by their revenue division.

Politics

Parliament segments 
Nellore (Lok Sabha constituency)
 Tirupati (Lok Sabha constituency).

Assembly constituency
Nellore and Tirupati,Lok Sabha constituency presently comprises the following Legislative Assembly segments:

Cities and towns

Transport 
National Highway 16 passes through the city.

Krishnapatnam Port is an important port situated in the district on the Bay of Bengal.

Culture

People from Nellore district 

People from Nellore district include N. Janardhana Reddy, chief Minister of Andhra Pradesh from 1990 to 1992; Bezawada Gopala Reddy, chief minister of Andhra State from 1954 to 1956; Puchalapalli Sundarayya, founding member of the CPI (M), Alladi Krishnaswamy Iyer, Panabaka Lakshmi, former Union Minister; Venkaiah Naidu, vice president of India; film industry include, Singeetam Srinivasa Rao, S. P. Balasubrahmanyam, A. Kodandarami Reddy, S. Thaman, M. S. Reddy, A. M. Rathnam; Vanisri; Ponaka Kanakamma, social worker and activist; Gunturu Seshendra Sarma, a poet; Malli Mastan Babu, a mountaineer.

Education 
The primary and secondary school education is imparted by government, aided and private schools, under the School Education Department of the state. As per the school information report for the academic year 2017–18, there are a total of 4,489 schools. These include: 21 government, 3,140 mandal and zilla parishads, 2 residential, 1,077 private, 10 model, 10 Kasturba Gandhi Balika Vidyalaya (KGBV), 106 municipal and 123 other types of schools. The total number of students enrolled in primary, upper primary and high schools of the district are 3,95,092.

References

Further reading 

 Samagra Andhrula Charitram

External links 

 Official website

 
2008 establishments in Andhra Pradesh
Districts of Andhra Pradesh